Christian Vázquez (born in Guadalajara, Jalisco, Mexico) is a Mexican actor; best known in his native country for his multiple roles in Mexican films. Vázquez studied performing arts at the University of Guadalajara. He started working as a waiter in a hotel and later began his acting career doing television commercials for different brands.

Filmography

Film roles

Television roles

References

External links 
 

Living people
Mexican male film actors
Mexican male telenovela actors
People from Guadalajara, Jalisco
1986 births